Ellie, or Elly, is a given name, usually feminine. The name stands on its own or can be a shortened form of any of the numerous female names beginning with the syllable El-, in particular Eleanor or Elizabeth  and Elvira. It can also be a short form of Elena, Michelle, Elnaz, Elham, Elaheh, Eliana, Eloise, Emelia, Elisa, Ellisha, Elisha, Elesha, Shelly, Eleni, or Petronella and as a masculine name of Eleazer, Elliot, Elron, or Elston. In Greek mythology, Ellie (Helle) was the daughter of Athamas and Nephele; sister of Phrixus.

Notable people named Ellie

Women 
 Elly Ameling (born 1933), Dutch soprano
 Elly Appel-Vessies (1952–2022), Dutch tennis player
 Ellie Bamber (born 1997), English actress
 Ellie Beaven (born 1980), English actress
 Elly Beinhorn (1907–2007), German pilot
 Ellie Black (born 1995), Canadian artistic gymnast
 Ellie Blackburn (born 1995), Australian rules footballer
 Elly Blanksma-van den Heuvel (born 1959), Dutch politician
 Elly Botbijl (born 1940), Dutch fencer
 Ellie Brazil (born 1999), English association footballer
 Ellie van den Brom (born 1949), Dutch speed skater
 Ellie Brush (born 1988), Australian association footballer
 Ellie Cachette (born 1985), American technology executive, activist and author
 Ellie Campbell, a British singer
 Ellie Carpenter (born 2000), Australian footballer
 Ellie Cole (born 1991), Australian Paralympic swimmer and wheelchair basketball player
 Ellie Cornell (born 1963), American actress and movie producer
 Ellie Crisell (born 1976), British journalist and television presenter
 Ellie Crowe, author
 Ellie Curson (born 1994), Welsh footballer
 Elly Dammers (1921–2009), Dutch javelin thrower
 Ellie Daniel (born 1950), American swimmer
 Ellie Darcey-Alden (born 1999), English actress
 Elly Dekker (born 1943), Dutch physicist and museum curator
 Ellie Downie (born 1999), British artistic gymnast
 Ellie Drennan (born 1998), Australian singer-songwriter, youngest winner of The Voice Australia
 Ellie Emberson, British Labour Party councillor
 Ellie Goulding (born 1986),  British singer, songwriter and musician
 Ellie Greenwich (1940–2009), American pop singer, songwriter and record producer
 Ellie Greenwood (born 1979), British ultramarathon runner
 Elly Griffiths (born 1963), British author
 Elly Gross (born 1929), Jewish Holocaust survivor and author
 Ellie Guggenheimer (1912–2008), American civic leader, author and philanthropist
 Elly Hakami (born 1969), American tennis player
 Elly Haney (1931–1999), American feminist theologian and community activist
 Ellie Harrison (artist) (born 1979), British artist
 Ellie Harrison (journalist) (born 1977), British journalist and presenter best known for her television wildlife work
 Elly Heuss-Knapp (1881–1952), German politician, social reformer, author and wife of German president Theodor Heuss
 Ellie Hill (born 1975), American politician
 Elly van Hulst (born 1959), Dutch middle-distance runner
 Ellie Jackson (1825–1854), first wife of Thomas "Stonewall" Jackson
 Elly Jackson (born 1988), British singer, songwriter and the sole member of La Roux, a former synthpop duo
  (born 1980), Danish rapper, comedian and actress sometimes credited as simply "Ellie"
 Ellie Kanner, American film and television director
 Ellie Kawamura (born 1993), American figure skater
 Ellie Kemper (born 1980), American actress, comedian and writer
 Ellie Kendrick (born 1990), British actress
 Ellie Kinnaird (born 1931), North Carolina politician
 Elli Kokkinou (born 1970), Greek singer
 Elly Koot (born 1943), Dutch  model, Miss Europe 1964
 Elly Kouwenhoven (born 1949), Dutch author and politician
 Ellie Krieger (born 1965), American nutritionist, author and host of the television show Healthy Appetite
 Ellie Lambeti (1926–1983), Greek actress
 Elly Lieber (1932–2020), Austrian luger, 1959 world champion
 Elly Ney (1882–1968), German romantic pianist
 Elly M. Peterson (1914–2008), American politician
 Ellie Moon, Canadian actor and playwright
 Elly Plooij-van Gorsel (born 1947), Dutch politician
 Ellie Roebuck (born 1991), English association footballer
 Ellie Simmonds (born 1994), British Paralympic swimmer
 Ellie Soutter (2000–2018), British snowboarder
 Elli Stai (born 1954), Greek journalist and TV presenter
 Elly Stone (1927–2020), American singer and actress
 Ellie Taylor (born 1983/1984), English comedian
 Elly de Waard (born 1940), Dutch poet
 Ellie Watton (born 1989), British field hockey player
 Elly Winter (1898–1987), German communist and political activist
 Elly Yunara (1923–1992), Indonesian actress

Men 
 Elrod Hendricks (1940–2005), American Major League Baseball catcher and coach
 Elston Howard (1929–1980), American baseball player in the Negro leagues and Major League Baseball
 Elly Idris (born 1962), Indonesian football coach and former player
 Elly Kadoorie (1867–1944), Jewish businessman and philanthropist in China and Hong Kong
 Elly Kayanja (born 1959), Ugandan brigadier
 Elly Kleinman (born 1952), American business executive and philanthropist
 Elly Lefort (born 1987), French and Monegasque bobsledder
 Ellie Mannette (1927–2018), Trinidadian musical instrument maker
 Ellie Rodríguez (born 1946), Puerto Rican professional baseball catcher
 Elly Rono (born 1970), Kenyan former long-distance runner
 Ellie G. Shuler Jr. (born 1936), retired United States Air Force lieutenant general
 Elly Tumwine (1954–2022), Ugandan general and politician
 Elly Wamala (1935–2004), Ugandan musician
 Elly (dancer) (born 1987), Japanese dancer

Fictional characters 
 Elli, a character and bachelorette in the Story of Seasons video game franchise
 Ellie, a character in Greek mythology who figured prominently in the story of Jason and the Argonauts
 Ellegaard, a supporting character in Minecraft Story Mode (Referred to as Ellie for short)
 Ellie Arroway, the main character in Carl Sagan's science fiction novel Contact and the film based on it
 Eleanor Bartlet, the middle daughter of President Jed Bartlet on the television show The West Wing
 Elle Bishop, a character in American television series Heroes
 Ellie Rebecca Brass, on the American crime drama CSI: Crime Scene Investigation
 Elly May Clampett, a main character in the American television series The Beverly Hillbillies
 Eleanor Elly Conway, on the Australian soap opera Neighbours
 Eleanor Miss Ellie Ewing, on the American soap opera Dallas
 Ellie Fredricksen, in Disney–Pixar's 2009 film Up
 Ellie the Octopus, in Pajanimals
 Elly the Elephant, in Pocoyo
 Ellie Linton, the protagonist of the novel Tomorrow When the War Began
 Ellie Miller, a main character on the television crime drama Broadchurch
 Eleanor Ellie Mills, on the British soap opera Hollyoaks
 Ellie Nash, in the Canadian television drama Degrassi: The Next Generation
 Ellie Riggs, the protagonist of the American sitcom Watching Ellie, played by Julia Louis-Dreyfus
 Dr. Ellie Sattler, in Jurassic Park
 Ellie Torres, a main character on the American television comedy Cougar Town
 Elly Van Houten, in the Xenogears video game
 Elinor "Ellie" Walker, from the 1960s television series The Andy Griffith Show
 Ellie Woodcomb, on the American series Chuck
 Ellie, a ghost in Elly & Jools, an Australian children's television series
 Ellie (The Last of Us), a main character from the video game The Last of Us
 Ellie Appleton, a character from the movie Yesterday
 Ellie Rose, a main supporting character from the point and click video game series Henry Stickmin

See also
 Cyclone Ellie, a list of tropical cyclones named Ellie
 Elle (disambiguation)
 Elli (disambiguation)
 Elly (disambiguation)
 Elie Rous (1909–?), English football manager, primarily in France
 Elie Wiesel (1928–2016), Romanian-born American Jewish writer, professor, political activist, Nobel Laureate and Holocaust survivor.

References

English feminine given names
Feminine given names
Lists of people by nickname
Hypocorisms